Sandile Hlatjwako (born 14 February 1988) is a Liswati footballer.

International career

International goals
Scores and results list eSwatini's goal tally first.

References

External links 
 

1988 births
Living people
Eswatini international footballers
Association football forwards
Mbabane Swallows players
Swazi footballers